The Savage Innocents is a 1960 adventure film directed and co-written by Nicholas Ray. Anthony Quinn and Yoko Tani star, with Lee Montague, Marco Guglielmi, Carlo Giustini, Anthony Chinn, and Michael Chow in supporting roles, alongside Peter O' Toole in an early film role. It was adapted from the novel Top of the World by Swiss writer Hans Rüesch.

The film was an international co-production, with British, Italian and French interests involved; in the United States it was released by Paramount Pictures. The film was shot on-location in the Canadian Arctic, with interiors shot in Britain's Pinewood Studios and in Rome's Cinecittà studios. It was entered in the 1960 Cannes Film Festival. The film's themes include Inuit survival in the extreme arctic wilderness, as well as their raw existence and struggle to maintain their lifestyle against encroaching civilization.

Plot
An Inuk hunter kills a Christian missionary who rejects his traditional offer of food and his wife's company. Pursued by white policemen, the Inuk saves the life of one of them, resulting in a final confrontation in which the surviving cop must decide between his commitment to law enforcement and his gratitude to the Inuk.

Cast
 Anthony Quinn as Inuk
 Yoko Tani as Asiak
 Nikki van der Zyl as Asiak's voice (uncredited)
 Peter O'Toole as the First Trooper
 Robert Rietti as the First Trooper's voice (uncredited)
 Carlo Giustini as the Second Trooper
 Lee Montague as Ittimargnek
 Marco Guglielmi as the Missionary
 Anna Wong as Hiko
 Kaida Horiuchi as Imina
 Anthony Chinn as Kiddok
 Michael Chow as Undik
 Marie Yang as Powtee
 Andy Ho as Anarvik
 Yvonne Shima as Lulik
 Francis de Wolff as Trader

Reception

Critical
Eugene Archer gave the film a mixed review in The New York Times upon its 1961 release: "Most of the qualities that have made Nicholas Ray one of America's most highly praised directors abroad while leaving him relatively unpopular and unknown at home are clearly apparent in 'The Savage Innocents.'" Describing the movie as "badly cut" and "a bitter drama," Archer nonetheless found that "Mr. Ray's highly individualistic preoccupation with moral tensions expresses itself in a series of unusually provocative scenes" and concluded that this "strange, disturbing drama will leave most of its viewers dissatisfied and some outraged, but few will remain indifferent."

Box office
Kine Weekly called it a "money maker" at the British box office in 1960.

The Mighty Quinn
Bob Dylan is widely believed to have written the song "Quinn the Eskimo (The Mighty Quinn)" in tribute to Quinn's performance.

References

External links
 
 
 

Films directed by Nicholas Ray
Films scored by Angelo Francesco Lavagnino
1960 films
British adventure drama films
French adventure drama films
Italian adventure drama films
English-language French films
English-language Italian films
Films set in the Arctic
Films set in Canada
Inuit culture
Paramount Pictures films
Films shot at Pinewood Studios
Films shot in Canada
1960s English-language films
1960s British films
1960s Italian films
1960s French films